Holcomb High School (HHS) is a public high school in Holcomb, Kansas, United States operated by Holcomb USD 363, and serves students of grades 9 to 12.  The school colors are black and orange; the enrollment for the 2009–2010 school year was approximately 269 students.

Holcomb High is a member of the Kansas State High School Activities Association and offers a variety of sports programs. Athletic teams compete in the 4A Division II and are known as the "Longhorns". Extracurricular activities are also offered in the form of performing arts, school publications, and clubs.

Laptop Initiative
Holcomb High School has implemented the "1-to-1 laptop initiative" which provides every student with a laptop for the school year. These laptops allow students to do assignments online as well as type papers, create videos, and accomplish other school-related tasks.

Extracurricular activities
The extracurricular activities offered at Holcomb High School are small and limited due to the school's relatively small size. The Longhorns are classified as a 4A Division II school, the fourth-largest classification in Kansas according to the Kansas State High School Activities Association. Throughout its history, Holcomb has won several state championships in various sports. Many graduates have gone on to participate in Division I, Division II, and Division III athletics.

State Championships 

Holcomb High School offers the following sports:

Fall
 Football
 Volleyball
 Boys Cross-Country
 Girls Cross-Country
 Girls Golf
 Cheerleading

Winter
 Boys Basketball
 Girls Basketball
 Wrestling
 Boys Bowling
 Girls Bowling
 Winter Cheerleading

Spring
 Baseball
 Boys Golf
 Softball
 Boys Track and Field
 Girls Track and Field

See also
 List of high schools in Kansas
 List of unified school districts in Kansas

References

External links

 Official school website
 USD 363, school district
Maps
 Kansas School District Boundary Map, KSDE
 Holcomb City Map, KDOT
 Finny County Map, KDOT

Public high schools in Kansas
Schools in Finney County, Kansas